The 1926 Northern Arizona Lumberjacks football team was an American football team that represented Northern Arizona Teachers College (now known as Northern Arizona University) as an independent during the 1926 college football season. The Lumberjacks compiled a 5–2 record, shut out five of seven opponents, and outscored all opponents by a total of 139 to 55.

Emzy Harvey Lynch was the team's head coach. The 1926 season was his first and only as head coach.

The team played its home games at McMullen Field in Flagstaff, Arizona.

Schedule

References

Arizona State–Flagstaff
Northern Arizona Lumberjacks football seasons
Northern Arizona Lumberjacks football